Anastasios "Tasos" Papachristos (born 5 March 1993) is a Greek professional footballer who plays as a left-back for Super League 2 club Veria.

References

1993 births
Living people
Greek footballers
Greek expatriate footballers
Super League Greece players
Football League (Greece) players
Super League Greece 2 players
Gamma Ethniki players
Ettan Fotboll players
Platanias F.C. players
Panegialios F.C. players
Asteras Tripolis F.C. players
Panthrakikos F.C. players
A.E. Sparta P.A.E. players
Akropolis IF players
Association football defenders
Veria NFC players
Footballers from Aigio